Joseph Callaerts (11 August 1830 – 3 March 1901) was a Belgian organist, carillonneur, composer and music teacher. He was an important member of the Belgian school of organ playing.

Biography
Joseph Callaerts (sometimes referred to as Jozef) was born in 1830 in Antwerp, and spent nearly all of his life in that city. He started learning music when he was a boy, singing in Antwerp's choir of the Cathedral of Our Lady. As a young man, he studied the organ with Jacques-Nicolas Lemmens at the Brussels Royal Conservatoire, and he won the first prize in organ at that institution in 1856.

Starting in 1850, Callaerts served as the organist at the Jesuit College in Antwerp. In 1855 he became the organist at Antwerp Cathedral and in 1863 he became carillonneur of the city of Antwerp. From 1867 on, he taught organ and harmony at the Royal Conservatoire of Antwerp, which had its name changed to the Royal Flemish Conservatoire in 1898. He also gave expert advice in the building of several organs.

Callaerts's compositions include an opera called Le Retour imprévu, a symphony, a piano concerto, an organ concerto, a violin and orchestra concertpiece, chamber music, choral music, songs and many works for solo organ and solo piano.

Selected works 
 Stage work
 Opera Le Retour imprévu (Antwerp 1889)
 Orchestral works
 Grande Fantaisie de Concert for organ and orchestra Op. 4
 Symphonic poem Le Retour d'Ulysse
 Symphony (1879) 
 Vocal work
 Lentevreugd for two tenor and two bass voices
 Messe, graduel & offertoire for four-part chorus (or soloists) and organ Op. 4
 Mass for soprano, alto, bass and organ Op. 24
 At least 2 other masses
 Cantata Le temps des études (Het studieleven) for solo, chorus (three equal voices), and orchestra, Op. 19
 Chamber music
 Trio in A minor for piano, violin and cello Op. 15 (1882)
 Andante sostenuto for cello or violin and piano Op. 16
 Piano works
 Piano sonata Op. 3
 Impromptu Op. 6
 Caprice Op. 8
 Fantaisie-Barcarolle Op. 11
 Air de Ballade op. 15
 Roosje uit de dalen
 Symphony for piano 4 hands
 Organ works
 Fifteen Improvisations Op. 1
 Grande Fantaisie de Concert Op. 5
 24 pieces for organ in 2 series each with 4 books:
 book I: Pastorale, Méditation, Marche Solennelle Op. 20
 book II: Adoration, Canzone, Sortie Solennelle Op. 21
 book III: Prière, Petite Fantaisie, Marche Nuptiale Op. 22
 book IV: Cantilène, Communion, Toccata et Final Op. 23
 book V: Mélodie, Invocation, Marche de Fête Op. 28
 book VI: Toccata, Offertoire et Duo, Marche Funèbre Op. 29
 book VII: Prière (No. 2), Allegro Giocoso, Marche Triomphale Op. 30
 book VIII: Elégie, Bénediction Nuptiale, Scherzo Op. 31
 Adoration
 Intermezzo in B minor (1898)
 Invocation
 Prayer No. 1 and No. 2
 Solennelle marche
 Tantum ergo
 two sonatas: No. 1 in C minor, No. 2 in A major (posthumously published in 1908)

References

Sources
Baker's Biographical Dictionary of Music and Musicians (1900), p 98

External links
 
 Biography at Orgelkunst.be

Belgian classical composers
Belgian male classical composers
Belgian classical organists
Male classical organists
Cathedral organists
Composers for pipe organ
Carillonneurs
Romantic composers
1830 births
1901 deaths
20th-century Belgian male musicians
19th-century Belgian male musicians
19th-century organists